Eric Harshbarger (born 1971) is an Alabama-based builder of large-scale Lego brick mosaics and sculptures. From around 2000 to 2006 he was commissioned to build for television shows and magazines for promotional purposes.

Harshbarger is also well known for his work in puzzle and game design. His Digits in a Box toy has been produced by Popular Playthings since 2007. Wired magazine featured an optical illusion puzzle of his design in 2009. Collaborating with Mike Selinker, Harshbarger co-authored an optimization puzzle for the Maze of Games in 2015. He also has hosted one or more puzzle parties in and around his hometown of Auburn, Alabama, every year since 2004. His puzzle TicTac's Tactics won Jury Honorable Mention at the 2018 International Nob Yoshigahara Puzzle Design Competition.

References

External links
Official site with descriptions and photos of all building projects.
Tina Baine, Do It Yourself: Build an architectural landmark for your garden - about the Eiffel Tower model.

1970 births
Living people
Auburn High School (Alabama) alumni
Puzzle designers
Auburn University faculty